Maj Karma (formerly Maij' Karman kauniit kuvat and Maj Karman kauniit kuvat) is a Finnish rock / metal band formed in 1992.

Members

Current line-up
 Herra Ylppö - vocals and lyrics
 Häiriö Piirinen - guitar
 Kimmo Kurittu - bass guitar (2005-)
 Janne Savolainen - drums

Ex-members
 V.V.V. - bass guitar (1992-2004)
 Junnu ja kummitusjuna - bass guitar (1992)
 Kanttori Väyrynen a.k.a. Paska Väyrynen - lights (1996-2002)

Discography

Albums
 Kaukana puhelimista (1996)
 Kaakao (1998)
 Ääri (2000)
 Rautaneito (2001)
 Metallisydän (2003)
 Sodankylä (2004)
 Ukkonen (2006)
 Salama (2009)
 Peltisydän (2016)
 101 tapaa olla vapaa (2018)

EPs
 Iskelmä (1997)
 Musta paraati (2004, a cover EP in tribute to the Finnish gothic rock band Musta paraati)
 Attentaatti (2007)

Singles
 Ovisilmä (1998)
 Buster Keaton (1998)
 Homma (1999)
 Rinta (2000)
 Valaiden laulu (2000)
 Rocktähti (2001)
 Romanssi (2001)
 Arpi (2003)
 Katutyttöjen laulu (2003)
 Kyynel (2004)
 Sodankylä (2005)
 Sarvia ja hampaita (2005)
 Rukous (2006)
 Luovuttanut enkeli (2006)
 Ukkonen (2006)
 Kokki, varas, vaimo ja rakastaja (2006)
 Salama (2009)

References

External links
 Official site
 Karmarock (an annual rock festival founded by the band)

Finnish musical groups